Grazanes is one of eleven parishes (administrative divisions)  in Cangas de Onís, a municipality within the province and autonomous community of Asturias, by northern Spain's Picos de Europa mountains.

Villages
 Samartín
 Beceña
 Cuerres
 Llenín
 Tarañu
 Villaverde

References

Parishes in Cangas de Onis